The 1997 World Table Tennis Championships women's singles was the 44th edition of the women's singles championship.
Deng Yaping defeated Wang Nan in the final by three sets to one, to win the title.

Results

See also
List of World Table Tennis Championships medalists

References

-
World